Goulaleu is a town in the far west of Ivory Coast. It is a sub-prefecture of Zouan-Hounien Department in Tonkpi Region, Montagnes District. The town is five kilometres east of the border with Liberia.

Goulaleu was a commune until March 2012, when it became one of 1126 communes nationwide that were abolished.

In 2014, the population of the sub-prefecture of Goulaleu was 20,479.

Villages
The twenty four villages of the sub-prefecture of Goulaleu and their population in 2014 are:

Notes

Sub-prefectures of Tonkpi
Former communes of Ivory Coast